"My Next Thirty Years" is a song written by Phil Vassar and recorded by American country music artist Tim McGraw.  It was released in July 2000 as the fifth and final single from McGraw's album A Place in the Sun.  The song reached number one on the US Billboard Hot Country Singles & Tracks (now Hot Country Songs) chart and it peaked at number 27 on the Billboard Hot 100.

Content
The song is an uptempo in which the narrator celebrates his 30th birthday and reflects on the things he will do in the next thirty years.

Critical reception
Kevin John Coyne of Country Universe gave the song an A grade, saying that McGraw "captures that feeling of settling in to who you’re going to be, and the growing confidence that you’re really an adult and that you’ve somewhat established yourself."

Chart performance
"My Next Thirty Years" debuted as an album cut at number 74 on the U.S. Billboard Hot Country Singles & Tracks for the week of April 8, 2000.

Year-end charts

Certifications

Notes

References

2000 singles
1999 songs
Country ballads
2000s ballads
Tim McGraw songs
Songs written by Phil Vassar
Song recordings produced by Byron Gallimore
Song recordings produced by Tim McGraw
Song recordings produced by James Stroud
Curb Records singles
Songs about old age